Kim Jerami Empasis Rebadulla (born August 14, 1994), known professionally as Kim Rodriguez (formerly Kim Komatsu), is a Filipino actress and model known for her role in Kakambal ni Eliana as a girl with a twin snake and in Strawberry Lane where she played a boyish girl who got sent to a rehabilitation center for youth offenders.

Early life
Rodriguez was born Kim Jerami Empasis Rebadulla on August 14, 1994, and was born and raised in Concepcion, Marikina.  Her parents separated when she was young. According to Rodriguez, she had the utmost affection for her grandmother, of whom she took care when she suffered a stroke and with whom she shared a passion in acting. Her grandmother died of natural causes in 2009, at the age of 73.

Career
Rodriguez began her career performing as an extra on television shows. She got her first role in the teen oriented show Tween Hearts in GMA Network.

By 2011 she played the role of Lourdes in the television series called Sinner or Saint which she got paired up with Derrick Monasterio which is also a part of Tween Hearts.

By 2012 she appeared in her very first film appearance in the movie called "Mga Mumunting Lihim" produced by Joey Abacan of GMA Pictures which stars Judy Ann Santos and Iza Calzado where she won as New Movie Actress of the Year in the 29th PMPC Star Awards for Movies. After her film debut she got cast in the Philippine Remake of the high rated Korean drama The 1st Shop of Coffee Prince which she played the younger sister of Kris Bernal and the girlfriend of Sef Cadayona.

By 2013 she was given her very first big break via Kakambal ni Eliana where she played the lead role Eliana, a girl with a twin snake. She was paired up with her co-star in Tween Hearts Kristofer Martin.

By 2014 She again reunited with her Kakambal ni Eliana leading man Kristofer Martin in Paraiso Ko'y Ikaw. In the same year she was cast as one of the lead roles in Strawberry Lane a story of four different young girls who form an unlikely bond in a detention center for youth offenders where they build up a strawberry lane as a reminder of their unending friendship. She is paired with Kiko Estrada.

Currently, Kim plays wide range of villain roles in GMA Network drama anthologies such as Wish Ko Lang and Tadhana.

As of 2022, Rodriguez is now a freelance actress. Her career is currently being managed by Ogie Diaz talent. Diaz's roster of talents can both appeared on GMA Network and Kapamilya Channel.

Filmography

Television Series

Television Anthologies

Film

Awards and nominations

References

External links
Kim Rodriguez at GMA Network

1994 births
Living people
Actresses from Rizal
Filipino child actresses
Filipino female models
Filipino film actresses
Filipino television actresses
GMA Network personalities
ABS-CBN personalities
21st-century Filipino actresses